The Family Strikes Back is a 1986 Hong Kong action comedy film produced, directed by and starring Dean Shek.

Plot
Professor Kiu (Roy Chiao) is a mad scientist who developed mental disorders from grieving the death of his son. Kiu orders his assistants to kidnap men to his lab, located in a private container on a vessel, for experiments. Police inspector Uncle Wah (Cho Tat-wah) had sent his subordinates to gather evidence in the vessel, but failed to find any.

Shek La-mai (Dean Shek), an acrobatic performer working in a nightclub, has practiced martial arts since childhood and was a former commander of the Special Duties Unit before he was dismissed by the police force due to accusations of sadism. Shek is currently a single father of three children living a happy life. One night during his performance, he and his protege, Lam Hong (Gary Lam), witnessed and intervened in a kidnapping incident by Kiu's henchmen, and the two became targets of Kiu. On the other hand, Uncle Wah discovers Shek's resemblance to a Japanese scientist named Toyota, who colluded with Kiu. Wah formulates a plan for Shek to act undercover as Toyota in order to gather evidence from Kiu's lab.

Cast
Dean Shek as Shek La-mai
Angile Leung as Vennila
Kwan Tak-hing as Shek Fei-hung
Gigi Lai as Shek Lai-chi
Gary Young Lim as Lam Jan Hong
Lau Tat-sang as Sonny
Roy Chiao as Professor Kiu
Lee Heung-kam as Kiu's wife
Cho Tat-wah as Uncle Wah
Pomson Shi as Luk
Helen Chan as Helen
Kam Shan as thug
Hoi Sang Lee as Kiu's Henchman
Sai Gwa-Pau as So
Liu Chun-hung
Kingson Shek as Cop
Hui Ying-ying
Yiu Yau-hung  
Wellington Fung as Manager
Teddy Chan as Police Inspector
Lau Shung-fung
Lo Wing
Lo Hung
Wong Lai-ching
Fong Chow
Wonh Kin-chow
Pai Lan
Wong On-tung
Lim Chan
Lee Yan-fai
Robert Goodson as Police commissioner
Barry Bullock as Inspector Kei
Don Ferguson
Jonathan Pine
Roy Stanton
Cliff Clark
Chang Sing-kwong

Box office
The film grossed HK$7,229,517 at the Hong Kong box office during its theatrical run from 27 March to 9 April 1986.

References

External links

The Family Strikes Back at Hong Kong Cinemagic

1986 films
1980s martial arts comedy films
1980s action comedy films
Hong Kong action comedy films
Hong Kong martial arts comedy films
Hong Kong slapstick comedy films
Mad scientist films
1980s Cantonese-language films
Films directed by Dean Shek
Films set in Hong Kong
Films shot in Hong Kong
1986 comedy films
1980s Hong Kong films